Riomalo de Arriba is a hamlet and alqueria located in the municipality of Ladrillar, in Cáceres province, Extremadura, Spain. As of 2020, it has a population of 4.

Geography 
Riomalo de Arriba is located 181km north of Cáceres, Spain.

References

Populated places in the Province of Cáceres